Jade Elektra (born Alphonso King Jr.) is a Black queer and HIV activist, drag queen, singer, recording artist (DJ Relentless), and stage performer originally from Tampa, Florida, based in Toronto, Ontario, Canada. Jade is openly living with HIV and through activism and outreach, has strived to make a positive impact for HIV-positive, queer people of colour, and LGBTQ communities in Toronto and around the world. Jade is a founder of POZPLANET and POZ-TO, which fight HIV/AIDS stigma by hosting social events, partnering with AIDS Service Organizations, and fundraising for community-based HIV/AIDS organizations.

Jade is a Canadian Foundation for AIDS Research ambassador. Her local performance of "Undetectable," a rendition of the Nat King Cole's classic "Unforgettable," has led to her performing this song for the U=U (Undetectable = Untransmittable) campaign at various events, including the U.S. Conference on AIDS in Washington D.C. in 2019.

Jade is married to John Richard Allan and lives in Toronto.

References

External links
Undetectable = Untransmittable Campaign Website

HIV/AIDS activists
Black Canadian LGBT people
Queer musicians
Canadian drag queens
Canadian LGBT singers
1967 births
Living people
Canadian rhythm and blues singers
Canadian jazz singers
21st-century Canadian LGBT people